Norgate is a surname. Notable people with the surname include: 

 Cecil Norgate (1921–2008), Briton Anglican bishop in Tanzania
 Craig Norgate (1965–2015), New Zealand businessman
 Frederick Norgate (1817–1908), British publisher and co-founder of Williams and Norgate
 Graeme Norgate (born 1971), British musician
 Kate Norgate (1853–1935), British historian
 Thomas Starling Norgate (1772–1859), British writer

See also
 Norgate shopping centre in Montreal, Quebec, Canada
 Williams and Norgate, British publisher